Maryvonne Kendergi or Kendergian,  (15 August 191527 September 2011) was a Canadian-Armenian writer, professor, musicologist, pianist, and Québécois commentator.

Life
Kendergi was born 15 August 1915 in Aintab to an Armenian family. Due to the Armenian genocide she fled to Syria, where she grew up, then moved to France. At the Sorbonne, she studied and gained an advanced degree in 1942. She moved to Canada in 1952, and became a Canadian citizen in 1960.

For ten years she hosted radio programs on contemporary music on Radio-Canada and also appeared regularly on television. She taught at the Université de Montréal.
She played an important role in the founding of the Quebec Contemporary Music Society in 1966. She was a past president of the Canadian Music Council.

Kendergi was appointed a Member of the Order of Canada in 1980, and promoted to an Officer of the Order in 1992. She was made a Chevalier in the Order of Quebec in 1985.

Death
Kendergi died on 27 September 2011 in Montreal, Quebec. She was entombed at the Notre Dame des Neiges Cemetery.

Honours
1980 – Member of the Order of Canada
1982 – Canadian Music Council Medal
1983 – The Lynch-Staunton Prize
1985 –  Chevalier de l'Ordre national du Québec
1985 – Prix Calixa-Lavallée
1992 – Officer of the Order of Canada
1994 – Medal of the Académie des lettres du Québec
2000 – Prix Opus, hommage

References

Officers of the Order of Canada
1915 births
2011 deaths
People from Gaziantep
People from Aleppo vilayet
Canadian people of Armenian descent
Members of the Order of Canada
Knights of the National Order of Quebec
Canadian musicologists
Women musicologists
Burials at Notre Dame des Neiges Cemetery
Syrian expatriates in France
Syrian emigrants to Canada